Shanin may refer to:

 Shanin, Qazvin, village in the Iranian province of Qazvin
 Nikolai Aleksandrovich Shanin (1919 – 2011), Russian mathematician
 Teodor Shanin (1930 – 2020), British sociologist, founder of the Moscow School for the Social and Economic Sciences